Eintracht Frankfurt II is the reserve team of Eintracht Frankfurt. Formerly known as Eintracht Frankfurt Amateure (Amateurs) until 2005 the team played as U23 (Under 23) to emphasize the character of the team as a link between youth academy and pro team.

The traditional home ground was the Riederwaldstadion but for safety purposes the team was forced to play at Bornheimer Hang. The ground was actually renovated for local rival FSV Frankfurt but since their unexpected promotion to the 2. Bundesliga and the stricter home ground requirements FSV used to play at Eintracht's actual stadium while the SGE reserves play at their home. From 2009 to 2014 both teams, FSV and Eintracht U23 played at Bornheimer Hang.

Since its re-establishment, the team plays at Sportpark Dreieich.

The squad was frequently supported by Ultras Frankfurt, especially when playing derby matches against Darmstadt and Kassel, both home and away.

History
Eintracht Frankfurt Amateure first played at highest level in Hesse when it earned promotion to the Amateurliga Hessen in 1969, winning the league in its first attempt in 1969–70. The team played in this league, renamed to Amateur-Oberliga Hessen in 1978, for the next 26 seasons, with three runners-up finishes in 1978, 1983 and 1995 as its best results after the 1970 championship. The last of those three allowed the club promotion to the Regionalliga Süd, newly formed the year before. The team lasted for only one season before dropping back to what was now the Oberliga Hessen but won promotion again in 2002. Again it played in the Regionalliga for only one season but in 2008 it qualified for the new Regionalliga Südwest, where it played for six seasons until 2014.

In April 2014, the club board of Eintracht Frankfurt decided to withdraw the U23 team from league operations, as was FSV Frankfurt II and Bayer 04 Leverkusen II, after a ruling by the DFL allowed all Bundesliga and 2. Bundesliga clubs to freely choose whether or not to operate an under-23 reserve team. Previous to that such teams had been compulsory.

On 14 February 2022 Eintracht Frankfurt applied to have a reserves team to be re-admitted to the 5th tier Hessenliga for the 2022–23 season.

On 21 February the Hessian Football Association approved the incorporation of the Eintracht reserves team into the Hessenliga.  The team will play at the Hahn Air Sportpark in Dreieich.

Current squad

Famous players

Marcos Álvarez
Abassin Alikhil (represented Afghanistan while being signed at Eintracht Frankfurt U23)
Ali Amiri (represented Afghanistan while being signed at Eintracht Frankfurt U23)
Zubayr Amiri (represented Afghanistan while being signed at Eintracht Frankfurt U23)
Mimoun Azaouagh
Matthias Becker
Manfred Binz
Rudolf Bommer
Ronny Borchers
Erol Bulut
Mounir Chaftar
Daniyel Cimen
Christian Demirtaş
Ralf Fährmann
Danny Galm
Baldo di Gregorio
Giuseppe Gemiti
Daniel Gunkel
Matthias Hagner
Marcel Heller
Martin Hess
Petar Hubchev
Jermaine Jones
Sebastian Jung
Jürgen Klopp
Kevin Kraus
Benjamin Lense
Krešo Ljubičić
Jean-Paul Ndeki
Markus Neumayr
Oka Nikolov
Christoph Preuß
Peter Reichel
Christopher Reinhard
Marco Russ
Milad Salem (represented Afghanistan while being signed at Eintracht Frankfurt U23)
Antônio da Silva
Markus Steinhöfer
Albert Streit
Faton Toski
Cenk Tosun
Juvhel Tsoumou
Angelo Vaccaro
Lars Weißenfeldt
Jan Zimmermann

Managers
The recent managers of the club:
2000–2005: Bernhard Lippert
2005: Armin Kraaz
2006–2007: Petar Hubchev
2007–2010: Frank Leicht
2010–2012: Oscar Corrochano
2012–2014: Alexander Schur
2022–: Kristjan Glibo

Honours
The club's honours:

League
Oberliga Hessen / Hesse Championship 
 Champions: 1970, 2002
 Runners-up: 1978, 1983, 1995
Landesliga Hessen-Süd 
 Champions: 1969

Cup
Hesse Cup 
 Winners: 1969

Recent seasons
The recent season-by-season performance of the club:

 With the introduction of the Regionalligas in 1994 and the 3. Liga in 2008 as the new third tier, below the 2. Bundesliga, all leagues below dropped one tier. In 2012, the number of Regionalligas was increased from three to five with all Regionalliga Süd clubs except the Bavarian ones entering the new Regionalliga Südwest.

Key

References

External links
 Official club website 
 Eintracht Frankfurt II at Weltfussball.de 

Eintracht Frankfurt
Frankfurt, Eintracht U23
Frankfurt, Eintracht U23
Football clubs in Frankfurt
Association football clubs disestablished in 2014
2014 disestablishments in Germany

de:Eintracht Frankfurt#Die zweite Mannschaft